Xenophora conchyliophora is a species of medium-sized to large sea snail, a marine gastropod mollusk in the family Xenophoridae, the carrier shells.

Distribution
This is a Western Atlantic species.

Description 
The maximum recorded shell length for this species is 72 mm.

Habitat 
The minimum recorded depth for this species is 0 m; maximum recorded depth is 635 m.

See also
 Images of a live Xenophora conchyliophora, photographed in situ underwater by Anne DuPont

References

 Opinion 715, Bulletin of Zoological Nomenclature 417 (1964) 

Xenophoridae
Gastropods described in 1780